Pranaam is a 2019 Indian Hindi-language action film directed and written by Sanjiv Jaiswal, and produced by Anil Singh and Nitin Mishra. The film's score is composed by Jaan Nissar Lone. The film stars Rajeev Khandelwal, Abhimanyu Singh, Atul Kulkarni, Vikram Gokhale and Sameksha Singh. The film follows story of an IAS officer turned gangster (played by Rajeev Khandelwal). It was released theatrically on 9 August 2019.

Cast 
 Rajeev Khandelwal as Ajay Singh
 Atul Kulkarni as Inspector Rajpal Singh
 Abhimanyu Singh as Gyanu Singh
 Sameksha Singh as Manjri Shukla
 Vikram Gokhale as Tej Pratap Singh
 Apoorva Arora as Soha
 Meenakshi Sethi as Tej Pratap Singh's wife
 Randeep Rai as Rahul ( a young lawyer )
 Aniruddh Dave as Arjun
 S. M. Zaheer as Deenanath (Baba)

Marketing and release
The film was released on 9 August 2019.

Soundtrack

The music is composed by Vishal Mishra and Jaan Nisaar Lone.

References

External links
 

Indian action films
Films shot in India
2019 films
20th Century Fox films
Films shot in Mumbai
2010s Hindi-language films
Films shot in Lucknow
Films set in Lucknow
2019 action films